Arya Group of Colleges (also known as Arya College) is a Group of four private Engineering Colleges located in Jaipur, Rajasthan, India. It focuses primarily on higher education and research in engineering and Technology. It has grown to five colleges from one catering to education in engineering, research & technology and pharmacy and with two established campuses at Kukas and Ajmer Road with over 15 academic departments.

History
The first college was established in 2000. During this period, the transformation from one engineering college to a group was backed by Dr. Arvind Agarwal, Group Chairman. The Arya Group has expanded its campuses at two ends of Jaipur.

The group has been backed by awards in India from Bill Clinton, Pranab Mukharjee, Venkaiah Naidu and others . The Group has private residential facilities. 

Arya Group of Colleges was  the first college to establish a robotics lab in North India.

Courses offered

Computer Science & Engineering
Information Technology
Electronics & Communication Engineering 
Electrical Engineering 
Mechanical Engineering 
Civil Engineering 
Artificial Intelligence & Data Science
B.Pharma / M.Pharma
MBA (Masters of Business Administration) 
B.A / B.Com /  B.Sc.

Constituent colleges

AIET - Arya Institute of Engineering & Technology (also known as Arya Main Campus), Kukas, Jaipur - REAP Code-11
ACERC - Arya College of Engineering & Research Centre, Kukas, Jaipur  - REAP Code-48
AIETM - Arya Institute of Engineering Technology & Management, Omaxe City, Ajmer Road, Jaipur  - REAP Code-46
ACP - Arya College of Pharmacy, Kukas, Jaipur
APGC - Arya Perfect Graduate College, Omaxe City, Jaipur

Student Life 
Arya Group of Colleges provides on-campus residential facilities to its students, researchers and staff. The students are given sports facilities for indoor as well as outdoor games, including yoga, running tracks, tennis court, cricket, hockey, football, volleyball, basketball, badminton, table tennis, carom, chess and a fully equipped gym.

The campus has five hostels. The campus also has a guest house for parents and guests. Every hostel has mess halls. The campus has a café called “Arya Café.”

Annual Sports Day is held at the campus every year and from time to time, inter hostel matches are also held.

Annual Technical Festivals, Cultural Festivals, Sports Festivals are also held. There  are regular workshops on ethical hacking, web programming and various other essential topics.

Students are exposed to international teaching from the first year through webinars and lectures from professors. Cultural activities at old age homes, plantation programs etc., are regularly offered to the students.

There are more than 16 hobby clubs for students.

References

External links
in Official website
in External website

All India Council for Technical Education
Engineering colleges in Jaipur
Engineering colleges in Rajasthan
Educational institutions established in 2000
2000 establishments in India
2000 establishments in Rajasthan